The D-class (EA16) lifeboat is a class of inflatable boat operated since 1987 by the Royal National Lifeboat Institution of the United Kingdom and Ireland. It has been replaced operationally by the D-class (IB1), but many are still used as part of the relief fleet, as boarding boats for the larger classes of lifeboat and by the RNLI Flood Rescue Team.

The type designator EA16 stands for Evans Avon 16.

Utilization
For more than 40 years the D-class served as the workhorse of the RNLI Inshore Lifeboat (ILB) fleet. Significantly smaller in comparison to the rest of the inshore fleet, the D-class is also one of the few RNLI types not to feature a rigid hull. The main aspect of the boat would be both its size and weight - only . The D-class was specifically designed as a light and highly manoeuvrable rapid response craft.

Design and construction

The D-class lifeboat consists of two sponsons, together housing seven inflatable segments intersected by baffles. The main construction fabric is Hypalon-coated Nylon which provides a durable, non-tear surface.

This was one of the smaller classes of lifeboat operated by the RNLI, and they were a common sight at lifeboat stations around the coast. Unlike other members of the ILB fleet, the D-class does not have a rigid hull; all others, with the exception of the Arancia, hovercraft, and ALB Tenders, are Rigid Inflatable Boats (RIBs).

The D-class normally had a crew of three or four and was primarily used for surfer/swimmer incidents as well as assisting in cliff incidents where the casualty was near the water. The very nature of its work required a swift response,

Fleet

References

External links

RNLI Fleet
RNLI Lifeboats

Royal National Lifeboat Institution lifeboats
Inflatable boats